Coláiste Bríde is a secondary school located in Clondalkin, South Dublin, Ireland.

Coláiste Bríde was founded by the Presentation Sisters in 1955. Coláiste Bríde is a Voluntary Catholic Secondary School for girls only, operating under the Trusteeship of CEIST (Catholic Education on Irish Schools).

The school hosted a number of prominent Irish personalities, including Niall Breslin (Bressie), Miriam O'Callaghan and the Former Governor of Mountjoy Prison, John Lonergan, who gave inspirational and motivational speeches to over 900 students.

New Building 
The construction of the new building began in 2004, costing over 13 million euro. Overseen by engineer Lawson Mealiffe it officially opened in May 2008. It provides facilities such as a canteen, gym, library, science labs, home economics kitchens, IT labs, three state of the art equipped art rooms, a garden and lockers. A St Brigid's Cross design featured in the Reception and General Purpose Area was designed by Kate Griffin, a sixth year student of Coláiste Bríde while on work experience in an architect's office.

Extracurricular activities
Sports: Volleyball, football, GAA, camogie, basketball, badminton, tennis, table tennis, gymnastics
Music Lessons: guitar, violin, piano, dance, choir
Language clubs: Irish, French
Study: Learning Hub, Maths club
Other clubs: pair reading, photography club, LGBTQ club, debating

Events
 Christmas Concert organised each year showcasing acting, dancing, and a Christmas debate.
 W.O.W. (Walk On Wednesdays) was a project organised by the schools Green Flag Committee to encourage students to walk to school to promote healthy living and receive another Green Flag. 
 Annual "DEAR" (Drop Everything And Read) week, encouraging students and staff to read more literature.
 Musical performed by students in Transition Year of Colaiste Bride and Moyle Park College 
Grease performed in 2009
Fame  performed in 2010
Hairspray performed in 2015
All Shook Up performed in 2018
"Well Being Week" is organised every year in the school, promoting mental and physical health and has been extremely successful in the past few years with activities such as dancing, yoga, tea parties and a concerts.

Notable former students
 Hannah Tyrrell – Ireland women's rugby union international. Mary Kennedy Rte. Mary Harney former Government Minister

References

Clondalkin
Education in South Dublin (county)